Unitary Left (Gauche unitaire, GU) was a political party in France that was originally faction (under the name Unir or Unite) within the Revolutionary Communist League. The party is led by Christian Picquet, a former member of the Revolutionary Communist League.

The creation of the party was announced on 8 March 2009 at the founding congress of the Left Front electoral coalition ahead of the 2009 European elections. Picquet, whose opposition faction represented 3.7% at the founding congress of the New Anticapitalist Party, disagreed with the majority's refusal to ally with the Communist-led Left Front for the European elections.

As a result, Picquet's small movement integrated the Left Front and Picquet was the third candidate on the coalition's list in the Île-de-France constituency.

Ideologically, the party sought to unite all democratic socialists opposed to neo-liberalism under a common front.

The GU was part of the Left Front until 2014.

On 8 September 2015, the GU decided to merge into the French Communist Party. This decision was taken to limit the division of the left.

References

External links
Official website

2009 establishments in France
2015 disestablishments in France
Defunct political parties in France
Defunct socialist parties in Europe
Democratic socialist parties in Europe
Far-left politics in France
History of the French Communist Party
Party of the European Left former member parties
Political parties disestablished in 2015
Political parties established in 2009
Political parties of the French Fifth Republic
Socialist parties in France